TalentEgg.ca is a career resource that caters to Canadian students and recent graduates.  The site specializes in entry-level jobs, internships, and co-op programs and is based on Milkround.com, a UK-site that also caters to students and new graduates.

The company was created in April 2008 by Lauren Friese and is based in Toronto.  It is meant to replace traditional forms of on-campus recruitment.  The target demographic of the website is 18- to 25-year-olds.

The site includes job opportunities, company profiles, career resource articles, an employer directory, email notifications, and more.

It currently boasts traffic of 250,000 visitors per month from across Canada, with a projected audience of 3 million in 2013.

See also
 Employment website

References

 “TalentEgg cracks large-firm market” by Erin Bury, FinancialPost.com, August 13, 2012
 “Lauren Friese Interview” by Bryan Haines, About.com Online Business Success Stories, June 28, 2010
 	"Innovative job site may help even philosophy grads" by Mark Milner, CTV.ca News, April 27, 2009

External links
 

Employment websites in Canada